Eturu is a village in NTR district of the Indian state of Andhra Pradesh. It is located in Chandarlapadu mandal of Nandigama Revenue Division. It is a part of Andhra Pradesh Capital Region.

References 

Villages in NTR district